Morocco competed at the 2012 Summer Olympics in London, from 27 July to 12 August 2012. It was the nation's thirteenth appearance at the Olympics, having not participated at the 1980 Summer Olympics in Moscow because of its support of the United States boycott.

Comité Olympique Marocain sent the nation's largest ever delegation to the Games. A total of 63 athletes, 46 men and 17 women, competed in 12 sports, including the nation's Olympic debut in equestrian events. Men's football was the only team event in which Morocco was represented at these Olympic games. Twelve of the athletes had competed in Beijing, including world indoor champion and middle-distance runner Abdalaati Iguider, and breaststroke swimmer Sara El Bekri. Arab Games champion and taekwondo jin Wiam Dislam was the nation's flag bearer at the opening ceremony. Among the sports played by the athletes, Morocco also marked its Olympic return in slalom canoeing and road cycling after long years of absence.

Morocco, however, failed to win a gold and a silver medal in the Olympics for the first time since 1976, after poor athletic performances at these games. Abdalaati Iguider won the nation's only medal, a bronze, in the men's 1500 metres.

Medalists

Athletics

Moroccan athletes have so far achieved qualifying standards in the following athletics events (up to a maximum of 3 athletes in each event at the 'A' Standard, and 1 at the 'B' Standard):

Men

Women

Boxing

Morocco has so far qualified boxers for the following events

Men

Women

Canoeing

Slalom
Morocco has qualified boats for the following events

Cycling

Road

Equestrian

Dressage

Fencing

Morocco has qualified 2 fencers.

Men

Football

Morocco men's football team qualified for the event by reaching the final of the 2011 CAF U-23 Championship.

Men's tournament

Team roster

Group play

Judo

Morocco has qualified 4 judokas.

Shooting

Women

Swimming

Moroccan swimmers have so far achieved qualifying standards in the following events (up to a maximum of 2 swimmers in each event at the Olympic Qualifying Time (OQT), and potentially 1 at the Olympic Selection Time (OST)):

Women

Taekwondo

Morocco has qualified 3 athletes.

Wrestling

Morocco has qualified two quota places.

Men's Greco-Roman

References

External links
 
 

Nations at the 2012 Summer Olympics
2012
2012 in Moroccan sport